Henri Carette (1846 – 1911 in Paris) was a French politician. He was a member of the general council of Aisne for the canton of Coucy-le-Château.  He married Amélie Carette, a granddaughter of admiral Bouvet, a lecturer of Empress Eugenie, who had published two volumes with personal memories on the Tuileries Palace in the Second French Empire.

1832 births
1891 deaths
People from Aisne